Auburn Middle School may refer to:

 Auburn Middle School in Auburn School Department, Maine, United States
 Auburn Middle School in Riner, Virginia, United States
 Auburn Middle School in Auburn, Massachusetts, United States

See also
 Auburn High School (disambiguation)
 Auburn School (disambiguation)